Pokrovka is a rural locality (a village) in Ismagilovsky Selsoviet, Aurgazinsky District, Bashkortostan, Russia. The population was 17 as of 2010. There is 1 street.

Geography 
Pokrovka is located 32 km northeast of Tolbazy (the district's administrative centre) by road. Abdullino is the nearest rural locality.

References 

Rural localities in Aurgazinsky District